Jen Bryant (born 1960) is an American poet, novelist, and children's author. 

Bryant has won several awards for her work, including the Robert F. Sibert International Book Medal for The Right Word: Roget and His Thesaurus, the NCTE Orbis Pictus Award, and the Charlotte Zolotow Honor Award for A River of Words: The Story of William Carlos Williams, and the Schneider Family Book Award for Six Dots: A Story of Young Louis Braille. Her books The Right Word: Roget and His Thesaurus and A River of Words: The Story of William Carlos Williams have been distinguished with Caldecott Honors for Melissa Sweet's artwork.

Background and education
Jen Bryant (née Jennifer Fisher) was born in Easton, Pennsylvania and grew up in Flemington, New Jersey. Bryant grew up next to a funeral home, where her father and grandfather were undertakers. She was fascinated by the manual typewriter her father used and would “try and copy whatever material happened to be lying around: drafts of obituaries. And what are obituaries, really, but one’s life summed up in a paragraph or two? Good ones leave an impression of the person as an individual. I suppose as I practiced typing them, I must have absorbed some of the craft behind the writing of these little ‘biographies'.”

She graduated from Hunterdon Central Regional High School in 1978 and attended Gettysburg College, where she received her bachelor's degree in French and minored in German and secondary education. She then taught French and German at Paul VI Catholic High School in Chantilly, Virginia, where she also coached their cross-country teams.

Writing career
After moving with her family to Chester County, Pennsylvania, Bryant began to write poetry, to study independently with poet Tina Barr, and to host poetry readings in local independent bookstores. Encouraged and mentored by Eileen Spinelli and Jerry Spinelli, authors, she began to write picture books and novels in verse and to submit them to publishers. She continued to teach and to write while obtaining a master of arts in English (1999) from Arcadia University, mentored by  poet David Keplinger.

Beginning in 1999, Bryant taught writing and children's literature at West Chester University and delivered lectures and workshops for schools and colleges. She continued to write poetry for adults as well as novels and picture books for children, eventually focusing on the latter as her publications list grew. Bryant's writing for children has been recognized with several awards and honors, including the Robert F. Sibert International Book Medal, the NCTE Orbis Pictus Award, the Charlotte Zolotow Honor Award, and the Schneider Family Book Award. 

In May 2013, along with Julia Chang Bloch and David Gergen, Bryant received an honorary doctorate degree from Gettysburg College. She currently serves on the Board of Trustees for Gettysburg College.

Personal life
Bryant lives with her family in Chester County, Pennsylvania.

Published works

Non-fiction picture book biographies

 Working Moms: A Portrait of their Lives; six of seven books in the career series (1990–91)
Anne Abrams: Engineering Drafter
Zoe Mc Cully: Park Ranger
Sharon Oehler, Pediatrician
Carol Thomas-Weaver, Music Teacher
Jane Sayler, Veterinarian
Ubel Velez, Lawyer
 Georgia’s Bones, illus. by Bethanne Andersen (about Georgia O’Keeffe, 2005)
 Music for the End of Time (about Olivier Messiaen, 2005)
 Call Me Marianne, illus. by David A. Johnson (about Marianne Moore, 2006)
 A River of Words: The Story of William Carlos Williams, illus. by Melissa Sweet (2008)
 A Splash of Red: The Life and Art of Horace Pippin, illus by Melissa Sweet (2013)
 The Right Word: Roget and His Thesaurus, illus. by Melissa Sweet (2014)
 Six Dots: A Story of Young Louis Braille, illus. by Boris Kulikov (2016)
 Feed Your Mind: A Story of August Wilson, illus. by Cannaday Chapman (2019)
 Above the Rim: How Elgin Baylor Changed Basketball, illus. by Frank Morrison (2020)
 Fall Down Seven Times, Stand Up Eight: Patsy Takemoto Mink and the Fight for Title IX, illus. by Toshiki Nakamura (2022)

Middle-grade and young adult biographies

 Marjory Stoneman Douglas: Voice of the Everglades, illus. by Larry Raymond (1992)
 Margaret Murie: A Wilderness Life, illus. by Antonio Castro (1993)
 Louis Braille, Inventor (1994)
 Henri de Toulouse-Lautrec: Artist (1995)
 Lucretia Mott: A Guiding Light (1996)
 Thomas Merton: Poet, Prophet, Priest (1997)

Novels in verse

 The Trial (2004)
 Pieces of Georgia (2006)
 Ringside, 1925: Views from the Scopes Trial (2008) 
 Kaleidoscope Eyes (2009)

Novels in prose

 The Fortune of Carmen Navarro (2010)

Poetry

 The Whole Measure (chapbook), Greyhounds Press, 2006
 Hand Crafted (chapbook), Nova House Press, 2001
 Individual poems published in The American Literary Review, Clackamas Literary Review, Paterson Literary Review, Poet Lore, Smartish Pace, Comstock Review, The Pittsburgh Quarterly, Journal of NJ Poets, Northeast Corridor, Schuylkill Valley Journal, and others.

Magazines and anthologies
Bryant's poems and articles have appeared in Highlights magazine and IMAGE: A Journal of Art and Religion, among others. Her work is anthologized in Rush Hour: A Journal of Contemporary Voices (Delacorte Press); You Just Wait, The Poetry Friday Anthology; The Poetry Anthology for Middle School (all Pomelo Press); One Minute Till Bedtime (Little, Brown.)

"It's Not Pretty," Jen Bryant, Bookology magazine, Knock Knock, Apr. 25, 2015, accessed Oct. 29, 2018

“Working with an Editor,” Nonfictionary, Bookology magazine, February 8, 2018, accessed Oct. 29, 2018

"The Writing Apprenticeship," Jen Bryant, Bookology magazine, Knock Knock, Nov. 11, 2015, accessed Oct. 29, 2018

Translations and adaptations

Selected children’s books by Jen Bryant have been translated into Spanish, Korean, Chinese, Japanese, and Hebrew. Six Dots, her biography of inventor Louis Braille is available in a print/ braille edition.

A Splash of Red: The Life and Art of Horace Pippin was adapted for the stage by Book-It Repertory Theater, Seattle, Washington.

Selected awards and honors

Above the Rim: How Elgin Baylor Changed Basketball
 NCTE Orbis Pictus Award 2021

Call Me Marianne
 Society of Illustrators: "The Original Art" annual exhibition 2006

Feed Your Mind: A Story of August Wilson
 Center for the Study of Multicultural Children's Literature Best Books 2019
 National Book Festival Choice for Pennsylvania
 NCTE Notable Children's Book in Language Arts 2019
 Norman A. Sugarman Children's Biography Honor Book 2020
 Society of Illustrators "The Original Art" annual exhibition 2019

Fortune of Carmen Navarro, The
 Paterson Prize for Young People 2011

Right Word: Roget and His Thesaurus, The
 Caldecott Honor Book 2015
 Horn Book Magazine‘s Best Books of 2014
 Maine Lupine Book Award 2015
 Orbis Pictus Honor Book 2015 (NCTE)
 Robert F. Sibert Informational Book Medal 2015
 Society of Illustrators: “The Original Art” annual exhibition 2014

River of Words: The Story of William Carlos Williams, A
 Caldecott Honor Book 2009
 Christian Science Monitor Best Children's Books of 2008
 Cooperative Children's Book Center Charlotte Zolotow Honor Award 2009
 NCTE Orbis Pictus Award 2009
 New York Times Book Review Best Illustrated Children's Books of 2008

Six Dots: A Story of Young Louis Braille
 ALA Schneider Family Book Award for young children 2017
 Society of Illustrators: “The Original Art” annual exhibition 2016

Splash of Red: The Life and Art of Horace Pippin, A
 IBBY Outstanding Books for Children with Disabilities 2015
 NCTE Orbis Pictus Award 2014
 Robert F. Sibert Honor Book 2014
 Schneider Family Book Award, ages 0–10 2014
 Society of Illustrators: “The Original Art” annual exhibition 2015

External links

 Official website
 Jen Bryant's manuscripts, correspondence, and memorabilia are held at Gettysburg College, Gettysburg, PA. Finding Aid
 “Author Interview: Jen Bryant,” Eerdmans Young Readers, 2005, accessed June 3, 2018
 “Interview,” by poet and author E. Kristin Anderson, April 2010, accessed June 3, 2018
 "'I'll Write What Needs to Be Remembered': The Use of Verse in Children's and Young Adult Historical Fiction about the Vietnam War," Rachel Rickard Rebellino, The Lion and the Unicorn, Johns Hopkins University Press, Volume 42, No. 2, April 2018, pp. 162-179
 “Interview Session: Jen Bryant, author of Six Dots,” Twenty by Jenny, August 30, 2016, accessed June 3, 2018
 “Jen Bryant,” Penguin Random House, author interview, undated, accessed June 3, 2018
 “Jen Bryant: an Award-Winning Career Influenced by Dr. Seuss, Obituaries, and Libraries,” Amy Meythaler, MackinVIA, July 1, 2015, accessed June 3, 2018
 "Jen Bryant: Inspiration for Six Dots, Mackin Educational, YouTube, January 23, 2017, accessed August 21, 2018
 “Jen Bryant,” Bookology magazine, interview, April 20, 2016, accessed June 3, 2018
 "Jen Bryant wins awards for children's book on Horace Pippin," Sarah Figorski, Daily Local News, July 7, 2014, accessed June 3, 2018
 "Kaleidoscope Eyes: Jen Bryant," Jen Robinson, Jen Robinson's Book Page, September 28, 2011, accessed August 21, 2018
 "Rhetorical Technique in the Young Adult Verse Novel," Mike Cadden, The Lion and the Unicorn, Johns Hopkins University Press, Volume 42, No. 2, April 2018, pp. 129–144
 “The Right Word: Roget and His Thesaurus, Jen Bryant Interview,” Texas Bluebonnet Award interview, YouTube, February 15, 2015, accessed June 3, 2018
 "The Right Word: Roget and His Thesaurus and More," Leonard S. Marcus, New York Times, Nov. 7, 2014, accessed June 3, 2018
 "The Right Word Trifecta," John Schumacher, Watch. Connect. Read., Sept. 16, 2014, accessed August 21, 2018
 "Young at Heart: The western suburbs seem to nurture authors with a knack for connecting to kids and young adults. Here are 14 you should know.," J.F. Pirro, Mainline Today, undated, accessed June 3, 2018

References

External links

1960 births
Living people
21st-century American poets
21st-century American women writers
American women novelists
Gettysburg College alumni
Hunterdon Central Regional High School alumni
People from Chester County, Pennsylvania
People from Flemington, New Jersey
Writers from Easton, Pennsylvania
Writers from New Jersey